Tiécoura Coulibaly (born 4 May 1988) is an Ivorian football defender who currently plays for SC Gagnoa.

References 

1988 births
Living people
Ivorian footballers
Ivory Coast international footballers
ASEC Mimosas players
Stella Club d'Adjamé players
SC Gagnoa players
AS Tanda players
Association football defenders
Ivory Coast A' international footballers
2011 African Nations Championship players